Kevin Partida (born March 10, 1995) is an American professional soccer player who plays for Orange County SC in the USL Championship.

Career

College and amateur
Partida earned All-Region honors during his senior year at Sparks High School, a season which also saw the team win second place in the state.

Partida played for the UNLV Rebels from 2013 to 2017, redshirting during the 2016 season due to a knee injury. During his time in Las Vegas, he earned three WAC all-tournament awards. He was also a part of the team that went to the 2014 WAC championships and the 2014 NCAA Division I Men's Soccer Championship. Partida ended with a total of six goals and six assists over four seasons played.

He spent the summer of 2016 playing with the Burlingame Dragons, of the Premier Development League, where he made six appearances and tallied one assist. In the summer of 2017, Partida made nine appearances and scored two goals for FC Tucson, also of the PDL.

Professional
On January 21, 2018, Partida was selected in the third round (58th overall) of the 2018 MLS SuperDraft by the San Jose Earthquakes. He was signed by San Jose's USL affiliate Reno 1868 FC on March 13, 2018, where he would join former UNLV teammate and fellow San Jose draft pick Danny Musovski.

On June 9, 2018, Partida joined Reno's MLS parent club San Jose Earthquakes on loan for the remainder of the 2018 season. San Jose picked up their option on Partida and made the move permanent at the end of the 2018 season.

After the 2019 MLS season, Partida was released by San Jose. He rejoined Reno 1868 on December 16, 2019.

On October 30, 2020 following the USL Championship regular season, Partida joined MLS side Minnesota United ahead of their upcoming playoff fixtures.

On September 23, 2021, Partida returned to the USL Championship with Indy Eleven.

Partida signed with Orange County SC on January 10, 2022.

Personal life
Born in the United States, Partida is of Mexican descent.

Career Statistics

Honors
Individual
WAC All-Tournament: 2014

References

External links

UNLV bio

1995 births
Living people
American soccer players
American sportspeople of Mexican descent
Association football midfielders
Burlingame Dragons FC players
FC Tucson players
Indy Eleven players
Major League Soccer players
Minnesota United FC players
Orange County SC players
Reno 1868 FC players
San Jose Earthquakes draft picks
San Jose Earthquakes players
Soccer players from Nevada
Sportspeople from Sparks, Nevada
USL Championship players
UNLV Rebels men's soccer players
USL League Two players